The sixth season of the television comedy series Boy Meets World aired between September 25, 1998 and May 14, 1999, on ABC in the United States. The season was produced by Michael Jacobs Productions and Touchstone Television with series creator Michael Jacobs as executive producer. It was broadcast as part of the ABC comedy block TGIF on Friday evenings.

Cast 

Ben Savage as Cory Matthews
William Daniels as George Feeny 
Betsy Randle as Amy Matthews 
Will Friedle as Eric Matthews
Rider Strong as Shawn Hunter
Danielle Fishel as Topanga Lawrence 
Lindsay Ridgeway as Morgan Matthews 
Trina McGee-Davis as Angela Moore 
Maitland Ward as Rachel McGuire 
Matthew Lawrence as Jack Hunter 
William Russ as Alan Matthews

Episodes

Notes

References

External links
 

1998 American television seasons
1999 American television seasons
6